Onde-onde or onde onde may refer to:

 Klepon, a boiled rice cake stuffed with palm sugar
 Jin deui, a pastry made from rice flour covered in sesame seeds